Irina Kusakina (born June 5, 1965) is a Soviet luger who competed during the late 1980s. She won a bronze in the mixed team event at the 1989 FIL World Luge Championships in Winterberg, West Germany. She also competed at the 1988 Winter Olympics.

References

External links
Hickok sports information on World champions in luge and skeleton.

Living people
Russian female lugers
Soviet female lugers
1965 births
Olympic lugers of the Soviet Union
Lugers at the 1988 Winter Olympics